The Peace Child of Hiroshima is a 1991 bronze sculpture by Daryl Smith, installed at the University of Utah in Salt Lake City, Utah, United States.

Description and history
It depicts a young Japanese girl holding a folded paper crane. A plaque on the base reads: "Peace Child / Presented by Tadao Sunohara (1944 College of Business) in gratitude for the oasis of education he and other west coast Japanese Americans found here during WWII." The artwork was dedicated on August 15, 1991, and was surveyed by the Smithsonian Institution's "Save Outdoor Sculpture" program in 1993.

References

1991 sculptures
Bronze sculptures in Utah
Outdoor sculptures in Salt Lake City
Sculptures of children in the United States
Statues in Utah